Shepherd's Mill is a gristmill in Shepherdstown, West Virginia, located on Town Run just as it descends to the Potomac River. The mill was built some time prior to 1739 by Thomas Shepherd, Sr. (1705-1776) — founder and namesake of the town — as a two-story structure. The original millwheel was probably a wood overshot wheel.  The present  Fitz Water Wheel Company steel overshot wheel was built in 1894; with the addition of a third story in the late 19th century, the mill is more representative of that era.

References

External links

Grinding mills on the National Register of Historic Places in West Virginia
Buildings and structures in Jefferson County, West Virginia
Grinding mills in West Virginia
National Register of Historic Places in Jefferson County, West Virginia
Historic American Engineering Record in West Virginia